Njem (Njyem) is a Bantu language of Congo and Cameroon. Speakers are mostly (85%) monolingual, and many Baka Pygmies speak Njema as a second language.

References

 
Makaa-Njem languages
Languages of Cameroon